Samir Badr (born April 2, 1992) is an American soccer player who last played for Bethlehem Steel FC of the United Soccer League. He has previously played for El-Hodood of the Egyptian Premier League, Oklahoma City Energy, as well as the FC Porto and D.C. United academy systems.

Youth career 

Prior to joining D.C. United and F.C. Porto's academy systems, Badr played select soccer with the Bethesda Road Runners, a premier soccer organization in Bethesda, Maryland. Badr also played high school soccer at Robinson Secondary School, where he helped the Rams reach the state semifinals. Upon finishing high school, Badr opted to forgo college soccer and join the U-19 team at FC Porto, a premier Portuguese outfit.

Professional career 

After leaving Porto, failing to see much playing time, Badr went on loan to Egyptian outfit El-Hodood. In 2014, Badr signed with USL Pro side, Oklahoma City Energy. Badr made his first professional appearance on June 7, 2014 in a 1–1 draw against the Charlotte Eagles.

Badr was released by Oklahoma City at the end of the 2014 season and later signed with USL Pro club Colorado Springs Switchbacks on February 2, 2015.

Badr was on the move again in 2016, joining Philadelphia Union's United Soccer League affiliate Bethlehem Steel FC on January 8, 2016. Badr and Bethlehem Steel FC mutually parted ways in September 2016 prior to the end of the season, after making 10 appearances and posting two shutouts.

International career 
Badr made three appearances for the U.S. under-20 national team in 2010.

References 

1992 births
Living people
American soccer players
Haras El Hodoud SC players
OKC Energy FC players
Colorado Springs Switchbacks FC players
Philadelphia Union II players
American expatriate soccer players
Association football goalkeepers
Soccer players from Virginia
Expatriate footballers in Portugal
Expatriate footballers in Egypt
USL Championship players
United States men's under-20 international soccer players
Sportspeople from Fairfax, Virginia
F.C. Vizela players
FC Porto players
Robinson Secondary School alumni